Sainte-Marie-Cappel is a commune in the Nord department in northern France.

The small river Peene Becque has its source in Sante-Marie-Cappel.

Heraldry

See also
Communes of the Nord department

References

Saintemariecappel
French Flanders